Georgetown is the name of some places in the U.S. state of Indiana:
Georgetown, Allen County, Indiana
Georgetown, Cass County, Indiana
Georgetown, Floyd County, Indiana
Georgetown, Harrison County, Indiana
Georgetown, Randolph County, Indiana
Georgetown, St. Joseph County, Indiana
Georgetown, Washington County, Indiana

nl:Georgetown (Indiana)